Selina Anna Wagner (born 6 October 1990) is a German footballer. She plays as a midfielder for SC Sand in the Bundesliga.

Club career
Selina Wagner began her career at 1. FC Saarbrücken before joining VfL Wolfsburg in 2009. During the 2012–2013 season, she played an important role in their winning Champions League Campaign, scoring in the second leg of the Semi-Final against Arsenal. In 2015, she moved to SC Freiburg.

International career
On 29 September 2007 she made her debut in the U-19 national team in the match against Macedonia.

On 1 August 2010, Wagner came on as an 88th-minute substitute in the final of the U-20 Women's World Cup in Germany, beating Nigeria 2–0.

Honours

Club
VfL Wolfsburg
 UEFA Women's Champions League: 2012–13, 2013–14
 Bundesliga: 2012–13, 2013–14
 DFB-Pokal: 2012–13, 2014–15

International
 FIFA U-20 Women's World Cup: 2010

Modelling 
At the time of the 2011 FIFA Women's World Cup, the German July/August issue of Playboy featured a photoshoot of Selina Wagner with teammates Annika Doppler, Ivana Rudelic, Julia Simic and Kristina Gessat.

References

External links
 
 
 
 
 Freiburg holt Wolfsburgerin Selina Wagner at Deutscher Fussball-Bund 
 Profile at SC Freiburg 
 
 Selina Wagner at Soccerdonna.de 

1990 births
Living people
German women's footballers
1. FC Saarbrücken (women) players
VfL Wolfsburg (women) players
SC Freiburg (women) players
Women's association football midfielders
SC Sand players